The Canon EOS M6 is a digital mirrorless interchangeable-lens camera announced by Canon on February 14, 2017, and released in April 2017. As with all of the Canon EOS M series cameras, the M6 uses the Canon EF-M lens mount. 

The camera's screen can be articulated upwards, so that a vlogger can see themselves in the screen. The camera lacks a built-in viewfinder which makes it considerably cheaper than the M5; an additional viewfinder for ca. 200 euro can be mounted on the camera via the flash shoe.

For sound, the camera has a 3.5 mm microphone connection, but no headphone port. 

The camera is one of the few EOS cameras which do not support Remote Live View shooting through the Canon EOS Utility software.

A new model was introduced in September 2019, the Canon EOS M6 Mark II. It is significantly larger and features a number of improvements, such as a better autofocus or full Remote Live View shooting. It is considered to be the successor of both the M5 and the M6.

Key features
Canon EF-M lens mount
24.2 megapixel dual-pixel, APS-C, CMOS sensor
Fastest AF focusing speed of 0.03 seconds
ISO 100 – 25600
Dual Pixel CMOS autofocus
1.04M-dot tilting rear articulating touchscreen

References

External links 
EOS M6 EF-M 15-45mm IS STM Kit Black
Canon EOS M6 Review at dpreview.com
Canon EOS M6 Review at the-digital-picture.com

Canon EF-M-mount cameras
Cameras introduced in 2017